Herceg may refer to:

 Herceg (title), South Slavic spelling of a German noble title
 Herceg (surname), South Slavic surname